The FS Class E.405 is a  class of   electric locomotive built in 42 units by ADTranz (now Bombardier Transportation Italy) originally for the Polish State Railways (PKP), but later acquired by Trenitalia Italian state railways.

History
The locomotive batch was originally commissioned by PKP in 1996 and the units were assembled in Poland at Wrocław Bombardier Transportation Polska's plant,  with the designation of EU 11. After a short operational stint of 8 locomotives on the Warsaw-Berlin line, they were later switched to Italy's Ferrovie dello Stato (FS), which later rechristened them as E.405 in May 2003. 

They are a development of the similar E.412, which are however designed for international goods transport and have polycurrent motor equipment (E.405 can operate only on 3000 V direct current lines). Thanks to their relatively large initial tractive effort, they can haul both heavy goods  and fast passenger trains.  

They are mainly in service on the Brenner Line for goods transport.

External links
Norm defining E.405's characteristics in Italy 

E.405
Bo′Bo′ locomotives
Railway locomotives introduced in 2003
Standard gauge locomotives of Italy
Bo′Bo′ electric locomotives of Europe